Rajouri Airport  is the airport serving the city of Rajouri, Jammu and Kashmir, India. The airport has no flights as of now.

Airlines and destinations
There are currently no airlines serving Rajouri.

References

Defunct airports in India
Airports in Jammu and Kashmir